NASCAR on Fox, also known as Fox NASCAR, is the branding used for broadcasts of NASCAR races produced by Fox Sports and have aired on the Fox television network in the United States since 2001. Speed, a motorsports-focused cable channel owned by Fox, began broadcasting NASCAR-related events in February 2002, with its successor Fox Sports 1 taking over Fox Sports' cable event coverage rights when that network replaced Speed in August 2013. Throughout its run, Fox's coverage of NASCAR has won thirteen Emmy Awards.

Background
On November 11, 1999, NASCAR signed a contract that awarded the U.S. television rights to its races to four networks (two that would hold the broadcast television rights and two that would hold the cable television rights), split between Fox and sister cable channel FX, and NBC and TBS (whose rights were later assumed by TNT) starting with the 2001 season. Fox and FX would alternate coverage of all races held during the first half of the season, while NBC and TNT would air all races held during the second half.

Beginning in 2001, Fox alternated coverage of the first and most preeminent race of the season, the Daytona 500, with Fox televising the race in odd-numbered years and NBC airing it in even-numbered years through 2006. For balance, the network that did not air the 500 in a given year during the contract would air Daytona's summer night race, the Pepsi 400. Valued at $2.4 billion, Fox/FX held the rights to this particular contract for eight years (through 2008) and NBC/TNT having the rights for six years (through 2006). Further on the cable side, in October 2002, Speed Channel – which was owned by the Fox broadcast network's parent subsidiary Fox Entertainment Group – obtained the rights to televise all of the races in the Craftsman Truck Series, a contract it bought out from ESPN.

During the first half of the season, FX served as the primary broadcaster of the Busch Series, airing all but the most prestigious races, which were instead shown on Fox. FX was also home to most of the NASCAR Cup Series night races, The Winston/All-Star Race, and the June race at Dover International Speedway. Should a Fox-scheduled race be rained out on their scheduled race day and rescheduled to resume the following Monday, FX would simulcast the race with some of Fox's affiliates (although FOX-scheduled rainouts now air in their entirety on FOX). Fox Sports Net covered the 2001 Gatorade Twin 125's at Daytona International Speedway, the only time it ever covered a race.

Contract extensions
On December 7, 2005, NASCAR signed a new eight-year broadcast deal effective with the 2007 season, and valued at $4.48 billion, with Fox and Speed Channel, which would also share event rights with Disney-owned ABC, ESPN and ESPN2, as well as TNT. The rights would be divided as follows:
 Fox became the exclusive broadcaster of the Daytona 500 and also hold the rights to the first thirteen points paying races. In addition, the network carried the Sprint Unlimited and two Truck Series races (the network aired the Kroger 250 from Martinsville Speedway, and the Ohio 250 at Mansfield Motorsports Park in 2007, and the Kroger 250 from Martinsville, as well as the San Bernardino County 200 at Auto Club Speedway, in both 2008 and 2009). Fox did not air any races of what is now the Gander Outdoors Truck Series from 2010 to 2013, with all 25 races instead airing on Speed and later Fox Sports 1. Fox's 2011 coverage ended with the STP 400 at Kansas Speedway.
 TNT carried six NASCAR Cup Series races during the month of June and the first half of July, including the Coke Zero 400 at Daytona. In 2013, in particular, the network aired Pocono Raceway, Michigan International Speedway, Sonoma Raceway, Kentucky Speedway, the Coke Zero 400, and New Hampshire Motor Speedway.
 ESPN and ABC (through the ESPN on ABC arrangement) carried the final seventeen NASCAR Cup Series races from the Brickyard 400 through the end of the season, with the Cup Series Chase for the Championship races airing on ABC (until 2010, when ESPN took over most of the coverage, leaving ABC with the last 3 Saturday night races in their broadcasting period). The entire Nationwide season was aired primarily on ESPN2 and ESPN, with selected races on ABC, NASCAR returned to ESPN airing the first six races including Daytona, Atlanta, Las Vegas, and ESPN2 carrying Phoenix to Michigan.
 Speed/Fox Sports 1 carried the Budweiser Duel races and the Sprint All-Star Race, as well as the entire Camping World Truck Series season, except for the 2 races carried each year by Fox from 2007 to 2009. After the 2009 season, all the Truck races aired on Speed/FS1 – with the exception of the 2014 Talladega race, which aired on Fox.

In October 2012, NASCAR extended its contract with Fox Sports through 2022, which allowed Fox the online streaming rights for its event telecasts; the Fox Sports contract also retains coverage of the first 13 races of the NASCAR Cup Series and exclusive coverage of the Daytona 500. On August 1, 2013, Fox Sports extended its contract by two additional years through 2024, due to NASCAR's contract with NBC Sports running through that same time, and acquired the rights to the first 16 races of the NASCAR Cup Series season, as well as the first 14 Xfinity (formerly Nationwide) Series events. As a result, Fox will broadcast the races it already covers, as well as all of the events held in June, which include the events at Pocono and Michigan with coverage ending with the Toyota/Save Mart 350 at Sonoma. Fox had previously held rights to these three races under its initial 2001–06 contract.

Under the current deal:
Fox broadcasts the first nine points races and two other races, the Coca-Cola 600 (totaling 11 races over the air), including the Daytona 500 and Busch Clash, Fox Sports 1 carries several other events, including the Bluegreen Vacations Duel, the All-Star Race and all other points races in the first half of the season that do not air on Fox (six races, four straight races after Fox's first nine races, then a break for the Coca-Cola 600, then two more race after that), plus the first half of the Xfinity Series season, with the exception of the more prestigious races, which aired on Fox from 2015 to 2018 and will be shown there in 2020–2024. They were aired on FS1 exclusively in 2012-2014 and 2019.
NBC will broadcast three regular season races, the Brickyard 400, Ally 400 and the Coke Zero Sugar 400, and five races in the NASCAR playoffs (8 races overall), with the other races in the second half being aired on USA network. However, in NBC's Olympics years, CNBC will air some Cup and Xfinity series races (CNBC did not air races during the 2020 Tokyo Olympics as NASCAR already scheduled an Olympic break).  In 2022, USA Network will air the races since NBCSN will be shut down at the end of 2021.  NBC also airs some races in the Xfinity Series, including some NASCAR Xfinity series playoff races.
Cup series races on NBC are a lead in to NBC Sunday Night Football (after local news and NBC Nightly News except for the final race of the season, when the race leads into SNF).
The Gander RV & Outdoors Truck Series remains exclusively on FS1, with 1-3 races airing on Fox (none in 2021–2024).
 Starting in 2013, Spanish-language network Fox Deportes airs select NASCAR Cup races either live or delayed.

Announcers

History

For its broadcasts from 2001 to 2018, Fox used a portable studio called the Hollywood Hotel for pre-race coverage. For the 2001 to 2007 races held at Daytona International Speedway, the infield media center situated next to Gatorade Victory Lane was used instead.

If the race is delayed to a Monday, the Hollywood Hotel studio was usually not used, with the exception of the 2012 Daytona 500, which was delayed by one day. This was because Myers also hosted a talk-show for Fox Sports Radio, resulting in him having to return to Los Angeles to begin the following week's shows. John Roberts filled in for Myers for this particular race, and had also filled in for Myers the previous week for the Budweiser Shootout as Myers was on bereavement leave.

However, if a Saturday night race is rained out to Sunday then the studio will be in use for the delayed coverage. Prior to 2015, if the hotel was no longer available, Jeff Hammond could be shifted to substitute for a pit reporter or analyst if necessary. For instance, Hammond did this in 2002 for the Dodge/Save Mart 350 at Sonoma Raceway to replace Steve Byrnes, as Byrnes was unable to make it due to the birth of his son Bryson. During the 2004 Dodge/Save Mart 350, the studio was not used and Myers and Hammond were located on the hillside on outdoor chairs; no explanation was given for this.

In 2011, Pizza Hut became the presenting sponsor of the pre-race show. In addition, the first segment of the telecast was moved from the hotel to a tented facility either trackside or in the infield, depending on the venue. The idea was to build a crowd around the production of the segment; this has similarities to Fox's own NFL pregame show in 2006, as well as the College GameDay football and basketball shows on ESPN.

In 2012, John Roberts filled in for Chris Myers as host for the Budweiser Shootout and the Daytona 500, as Myers was on bereavement leave following his son's death in a motorcycle accident. For the 2014 Sprint Unlimited, Michael Waltrip filled in for Darrell, who was undergoing gallbladder surgery; for Daytona 500 Practice and Pole Qualifying, the position was filled by Phil Parsons. Darrell Waltrip returned for the Budweiser Duels. In 2016, Jeff Gordon replaced McReynolds in the booth while McReynolds was reassigned as the rules and technical analyst, replacing Andy Petree.

In 2017, Dale Earnhardt Jr. joined the Fox booth as a guest color commentator for the Clash after deciding not to compete in the race as a driver. He would become a permanent color commentator for NBC in 2018 after he retired from driving full-time. With NBC's permission, Jr. returned to Fox as a guest color commentator for the GEICO 500 at Talladega in April 2022.

On June 10, 2017, the Xfinity Series race at Pocono Raceway was presented by current drivers in the Cup Series, the first time that a national sporting event was covered by currently active athletes. The presenters provided coverage from all three perspectives during the race (Hollywood Hotel studio, lap-by-lap commentary and pit road coverage). The driver commentators were Kevin Harvick (lap-by-lap), Joey Logano, Clint Bowyer (color analysts), Erik Jones, Ryan Blaney, Ricky Stenhouse Jr. (pit road), Danica Patrick and Denny Hamlin (Hollywood Hotel).

On April 28, 2018, the Sparks Energy 300, the Xfinity race at Talladega Superspeedway, was an all-drivers broadcast, the second time that a national sporting event was covered entirely by active athletes, the first being the aforementioned Pocono race. The presenters provided coverage from all three perspectives during the race (Hollywood Hotel studio, lap-by-lap commentary and pit road coverage). The booth team of Harvick, Logano and Bowyer was retained, while Ricky Stenhouse Jr. was moved to the Hollywood Hotel alongside Brad Keselowski, with Bubba Wallace replacing Stenhouse as a pit road reporter.

The studio was retired following the 2018 season due to the Charlotte studios getting redone in order to host more shows. In 2019, Fox often cut to the Charlotte studio during the race and talked to Jamie McMurray, who was new to the NASCAR on Fox team; also in 2019, Shannon Spake replaced Chris Myers as host due to Myers being moved to Fox's Premier Boxing Champions coverage, although Myers appeared on site for the Daytona 500, while Adam Alexander served as on site host for the rest of the season.

On May 25, 2019, the Alsco 300, the Xfinity race at Charlotte Motor Speedway, was an all-drivers broadcast, the third time that a national sporting event was covered entirely by active athletes, the first being the aforementioned Pocono race. The presenters provided coverage from all three perspectives during the race (Hollywood Hotel studio, lap-by-lap commentary and pit road coverage). The booth team of Harvick, Logano and Bowyer was retained, Erik Jones, Ryan Blaney, Bubba Wallace (pit road) was also retained. Brad Keselowski, Ricky Stenhouse Jr., and Chad Knaus hosted from the Charlotte studios.

In 2020, due to the COVID-19 pandemic after the fourth race of the season Fox started using their Charlotte Studio to the maximum extent possible to avoid travel, ensure social distancing, and limit the number of staff onsite at races. The only on-air talent onsite was at most two pit reporters per race, all other talent was stationed at the Fox Studios in Charlotte.

In 2021, Myers returned to hosting the at-track portions of pre-race alongside Jeff Gordon and Clint Bowyer. Spake, McReynolds, and McMurrary host pre-race coverage from the Charlotte studios.

After the 2021 season, Gordon left Fox to work for Hendrick Motorsports full-time as the team's Vice Chairman. (He had previously worked with the team during the second half of the Cup Series season when NBC was broadcasting the races, after spending his entire full-time career with them). Fox did not replace him with one permanent color commentator and instead filled his spot with rotating guest commentators as they do in the Xfinity, Truck and ARCA Series. Retired Cup Series driver Tony Stewart was the first guest color commentator and was in the booth for the Clash, the Daytona 500 and the race at COTA.

Broadcast booth
NOTE: This is Fox's broadcast lineup for 2023 

NASCAR Cup Series
 Mike Joy – play-by-play announcer
 Clint Bowyer – color commentator
 Larry McReynolds – rules analyst
 Rotation of guest color commentators (see full list below)
 Tony Stewart (Clash, Duels, Daytona 500, Fontana, Atlanta, Bristol, Talladega, Charlotte)
 Danica Patrick (Las Vegas, Phoenix)
 Kurt Busch (COTA)
 Guenther Steiner (COTA)
Xfinity Series
 Adam Alexander – play-by-play announcer (except Charlotte)
 Kevin Harvick - Play-by-play announcer (Charlotte)
 Michael Waltrip – color commentator (Qualifying)
 Coleman Pressley (in-race spotter analyst at Daytona, Phoenix, Atlanta)
 Rotation of guest color commentators (see full list below)
 Ryan Blaney (Daytona, Fontana, Las Vegas)
 Austin Dillon (Daytona)
 Joey Logano (Fontana, Phoenix, Atlanta)
 Kevin Harvick (Las Vegas, Phoenix, Richmond)
 Daniel Suarez (Atlanta)
 TBA (COTA)
Craftsman Truck Series
 Adam Alexander – lap-by-lap announcer (Daytona)
 Jamie Little - lap-by-lap announcer (Las Vegas and Atlanta)
 Michael Waltrip – color commentator
 Phil Parsons – color commentator (select races)
 Rotation of guest color commentators (see full list below)
 Kevin Harvick - color commentator (COTA, Kansas, Gateway)
ARCA Menards Series
 Jamie Little – play-by-play announcer
 Phil Parsons – color commentator
 Rotation of guest color commentators (see full list below)
 Austin Cindric (Daytona and Phoenix)
 TBA (All Other Races)

For Xfinity, Truck and ARCA broadcasts, the guest color commentator will usually be an active Cup Series driver, if not a crew chief. Starting in 2022, they are doing this for the Cup Series as well to replace Jeff Gordon. The guest color commentators for the Cup Series have been retired Cup Series drivers and crew chiefs.

Pit reporters
 Jamie Little (all Cup races and select Xfinity races)
 Regan Smith (all Cup races and select Xfinity and Truck races)
 Jamie Howe (All Truck and select ARCA races)
 Josh Sims (select Truck and Select Xfinity and Cup races)
 Heather Debeaux (ARCA)
 Amanda Busick (select Truck races)
 Larry McReynolds (Clash at the Coliseum, Duels at Daytona)
 Michael Waltrip (Daytona 500)

Pre and post-race show
 Chris Myers – on-site host (Cup Series)
 Michael Waltrip – on-site analyst (Cup Series)
 Shannon Spake – studio host (Cup and Xfinity Series)
 Larry McReynolds – studio analyst (all Cup and Xfinity Series races and select Truck Series races)
 Jamie McMurray – on-site analyst (Cup Series)
 Bobby Labonte - studio analyst (Cup Series)
 Kaitlyn Vincie – studio host (Truck Series)
 Trevor Bayne – studio analyst (Cup, Xfinity and Trucks)
 Todd Bodine – studio analyst (Truck Series races)

Former
See List of NASCAR on Fox broadcasters#Former commentators

Theme music
The original theme music for NASCAR on Fox broadcasts was in the same style as other Fox Sports properties (such as for NFL and Major League Baseball coverage) and was originally used from 2001 to 2008. In 2008, Fox introduced a new theme for its NASCAR telecasts titled NASCAR Love, performed by country singer Toby Lightman (an instrumental version was used for the opening segment).

From the 2011 Budweiser Shootout to 2015, Fox used the NFL on FOX theme song in NASCAR telecasts. In addition, country superstar Dierks Bentley unveiled a new version of his hit song "Sideways,” with new lyrics referencing NASCAR – which is played during the introduction of the pre-race show. "Sideways" was phased out entirely with the 2013 Sprint Unlimited telecast, with the Fox NFL theme music being used full-time. In addition, a new CGI introduction sequence, produced by Blur Studio, made its debut.

In 2015, the introduction sequence was eliminated in favor of intros unique to each track.

In 2016, Fox and FS1 (Cup Series only) reintroduced the original theme used between 2001 and 2008. FS1 continues to use their old theme for Xfinity Series and Truck Series.

On-screen graphics
Fox is known for being the first network to show a scoring banner across the top of the screen with scrolling text during NASCAR telecasts. In previous years when ESPN, CBS, and others owned the broadcasting rights, scoring had been displayed in a box on the top left corner. Fox was also the first network to use the unique font/styling for each car number (such as Dale Earnhardt's number 3, Jeff Gordon's 24, the Petty 43) for their on-screen graphics, as opposed to a generic font (however the banner continued to use just text). Other networks would adopt this innovation and is now commonplace for most American motorsport broadcasts.

From its debut until 2013, Fox initially used a scrolling ticker to display the current running order of drivers and other information (such as intervals and other statistics, shown on an occasionally displayed secondary line), instead of the boxes that were used by previous NASCAR broadcasters. Fox would eventually deploy the banner design across all of its sports properties, while its conventions would be adopted by fellow NASCAR broadcasters, including NBC, TNT, and later ESPN.

For the 2014 season, alongside a new corporate style, Fox replaced the scrolling ticker with a leaderboard-style sidebar occupying the right-side portion of the screen, with one section displaying the top three drivers, and a scrolling section displaying the remainder of the field of drivers. While Fox Sports president Eric Shanks justified the changes, noting that it would allow more of the field to be displayed at once and more frequently than the relatively longer ticker, the leaderboard was criticized by viewers during events leading up to the Daytona 500 (such as the Sprint Unlimited, Daytona 500 qualifying, and the ARCA series Lucas Oil 200) for obstructing too much of the screen.

In response to the criticism, Shanks stated that the layout of the leaderboard would be revised in time for the Daytona 500. The vertical leaderboard was reconfigured into a horizontal version with three columns of 3 drivers each, which could be resized into 2 longer columns of three drivers each to display intervals or other statistics (a version that was later used as the main graphic).

In the 2018 NASCAR season, NASCAR coverage adopted a new flat graphics package previously introduced during the previous NFL season. This package reintroduced a vertical leaderboard, although this time it initially occupied an opaque sidebar spanning the entire left side of the screen. The design was once-again criticized by viewers during events leading up to the Daytona 500, as the opaque sidebar reduced the amount of screen space devoted to race footage to a roughly 4:3 window, the ticker fell within overscan on some televisions, while some camera shots were not correctly framed to suit the new layout. By the Daytona 500, the graphic had been revised to remove the opaque sidebar, and make the leaderboard slightly translucent.

In 2019, during Daytona 500 qualifying, Fox introduced a new augmented reality "GhostCar," allowing for a live visualization of a previous driver's qualifying lap (such as the leader or driver on the bubble) to be overlaid into live footage of another driver's qualifying attempt. NBC had introduced the system in 2018, but only during replays. The GhostCar feature was re-introduced later in the season, when NASCAR ended its multi-car qualifying format in favor of the previous single-car format.

In 2022, Fox introduced a revamp of its on-air presentation for NASCAR (as part of a move towards dedicated graphics packages for each of Fox Sports' major properties, rather than a standard look shared by all telecasts), the package was built upon visual elements from the then-current NFL on Fox branding, including the use of stylized "comic book" illustrations of drivers.

Awards
NASCAR on Fox has won 13 Emmy Awards for its coverage, including three for Outstanding Sports Series (2001, 2005, 2007), six for Outstanding Live Event Audio Sound (2002, 2005, 2006, 2011, 2012, 2013), one for Outstanding Graphic Design (2001), five for Outstanding Technical Team Remote (2001, 2003, 2004, 2005, 2007) and one for Promotional Announcement Episodic (2008).

Criticisms

Turn cam and "Digger"

After limited usage in 2007, the network introduced the "Gopher Cam" full-time in 2008, a camera angle from the bottom banking of a track's turn. Fox implied that it invented the technology. However, it was quickly brought to light that Terry Lingner of ESPN, along with engineer James Fishman, had developed the technology 15 years earlier under the name "Tread Cam.” However, it should be known that the devices are completely different.

"Digger," a CGI-animated gopher character that was voiced by Eric Bauza, began as a symbol of the corner camera and was later adopted as an unofficial mascot for Fox's NASCAR coverage. Beginning with the 2009 Daytona 500, Digger was extended into a series of short cartoons that aired during the pre-race show, country music superstar Keith Urban recorded the theme song for these shorts. Storylines revolved around Digger and his life beneath the infield of a fictional racetrack. Other characters include his girlfriend Annie and the track's security chief, Lumpy Wheels (respectively named after the daughter of Fox Sports president David Hill, and former track promoter Humpy Wheeler). Digger's souvenir trailer at the tracks attracted sizeable crowds of families with young children. However, the cartoon segment drew wide opposition from regular viewers of the broadcasts.

After a NASCAR town hall-style meeting at the end of May 2009, Fox Sports chair David Hill reported receiving an email from a high-ranking NASCAR official whose identity he chose to conceal, stating that Digger could have been the cause of ratings declines for Fox's NASCAR coverage. Hill said "It was because of Digger that people were turning off in droves because they couldn't stand it, I said, I'm so sorry. If I'd known, I never would have created him. I didn't realize how insidious he was. It's the biggest crock of shit I've ever heard."

Among the reasons of criticism is the purpose of the character's usage. Though it was at one time commonplace for networks to create mascots for sports coverage to incorporate an educational and entertaining element into their coverage, which was the case with Peter Puck, Digger was created purely to add entertainment to the broadcast and reach out to a younger audience. Some NASCAR fans accused Fox of dumbing down and fluffing its coverage in order to gain revenue from Digger merchandise sales.

Despite continuous outrage from the NASCAR fan community, as well as talk from the NASCAR community that the Fan Council was not pleased with the situation, Fox did not announce any plans to drop the usage of the characters, and even had posted pictures of holiday-themed versions of the Digger die-cast in 2009 and 2010. In response to the comments, in 2010, the Digger cartoon was not shown during pre-race shows and Digger appeared less often at the bottom of the screen. Throughout the 2011 season as well as the 2012 Budweiser Shootout and Daytona 500, Digger appeared very sparingly, usually only during commercial bumpers. As of the 2012 Subway Fresh Fit 500, all appearances and references to Digger were dropped entirely from Fox's NASCAR broadcasts. However, nods to it occasionally came up (for example, at the Talladega race in 2014, when Carl Edwards showed debris on his firesuit, Mike Joy commented that he hoped that nothing had happened to Digger, to which Darrell Waltrip responded, "Digger's retired").

Digger made a cameo appearance in the 2009 20th Century Fox film Alvin and the Chipmunks: The Squeakquel. He also made an appearance in the Fox NFL Sunday introduction during the December 20, 2009 broadcast, in which the Chipmunks also made an appearance (20th Century Fox was then a corporate sister to the Fox network through News Corporation, 20th Century Fox was sold to the Walt Disney Company in 2019).

Commercial bias
In the starting grid for the 2001 Budweiser Shootout at Daytona International Speedway (which used 3D representations of the cars), Fox showed only the logos on the hoods of cars that had paid the network to advertise during the race. For instance, the Budweiser logo on the No. 8 car of Dale Earnhardt Jr. and The Home Depot logo on the No. 20 car of Tony Stewart were shown, but Miller Lite on the No. 2 car of Rusty Wallace was not. After outcry from some of the excluded companies, full logo graphics were restored to all cars four days later for the Gatorade Twin 125s telecast.

The computer-generated cars used initially on the starting grid and top-five standings when going to commercial break were phased out from main broadcast use, and were discontinued entirely in 2005 with the exception of the Daytona 500 starting grid (which featured the computer generated cars).

In 2012, Fox aired "In The Rear View Mirror" segments during the pre-race, showing computer-generated re-enactments of events during the 2012 season (most notably Juan Pablo Montoya's crash into a jet dryer at the Daytona 500), the intro sequence introduced in 2013 also incorporates CGI cars.

In the late 2010s and early 2020s, FOX was criticized by fans for heavily using crash footage for their ads. For example, Ryan Newman's massive accident from the previous years' Daytona 500 was used in many ads in 2021, and some fans interpreted this as a cash-grab from FOX attempting to make crashes the selling point of the events and not the racing itself.

End of the 2001 Daytona 500 and Dale Earnhardt's death
The 2001 Daytona 500, which was the first NASCAR points race ever telecast by Fox, also brought an unrelated controversy. At the end of that race, Fox concluded coverage shortly after Dale Earnhardt, who was fatally injured in a crash on the last lap of the race, was admitted to Halifax Health Medical Center in Daytona Beach, Florida. The network provided no updates on his condition at the time of the 5:15 p.m. Eastern Time sign-off (although no information was available at that time), and continued airing regular programming (with the animated series Futurama) at the moment Earnhardt's death was confirmed at a press conference held at 7:00 p.m. Eastern Time. NASCAR's other broadcast network partner, NBC, delayed a commercial break during an NBA telecast and ESPN (which aired the Craftsman Truck Series at the time) had coverage of Earnhardt's death and the aftermath that was both earlier and much more extensive. Fox News Channel and Fox Sports Net, however, did break into programming to announce the seven-time champion's passing, with Chris Myers providing reports on FSN programs. It is possible that Fox showed an on-screen crawl on the master control feed during Futurama. In addition, local affiliates may have chosen to pre-empt the episode, with anchors delivering the news live. However, none of this has ever been verified.

Shortly after the race, Hill explained to the Associated Press that the network had gone over its allotted time – as the result of an 18-car pileup on the back straightaway on lap 173 that led to the race being red-flagged for lengthy cleanup – and that continuing to cover the story would be too morbid. Producer Neil Goldberg also said Fox Sports staffers were not allowed near the crash scene.

When ESPN presented a tribute feature in remembrance of the ten-year anniversary of Earnhardt's death in 2011, it showed footage of the crash and aftermath, that looked like part of the live telecast. However, it was stamped with "WFTV,” the calls of the Cox-owned ABC affiliate in Orlando, Florida (Orlando and Daytona Beach share the same media market, and ABC's corporate parent The Walt Disney Company owns 80% of ESPN). How footage from Fox's NASCAR coverage got credited to the local affiliate of another network has not been made public, though it was likely that since none of the footage is similar to that of Fox's, the last lap was filmed by WFTV for their own local newscasts, intended originally as B-roll to add "color" to their post-race coverage of the Daytona 500.

Nielsen ratings

Top 10 races since 2011
Source:

References

External links

Fox Broadcasting Company original programming
2001 American television series debuts
2010s American television series
2020s American television series
Fox
Fox Sports original programming
Fox Sports 1 original programming
FX Networks original programming
American sports television series